Christopher Mark Luxon (born 19 July 1970) is a New Zealand politician and former business executive who is currently serving as leader of the New Zealand National Party and the Leader of the Opposition. He has been the Member of Parliament (MP) for the Botany electorate since the 2020 general election. He was the chief executive officer of Air New Zealand from 2012 to 2019. Luxon also served in Judith Collins' shadow cabinet as Spokesperson for Local Government, Research, Science, Manufacturing and Land Information, as well as being the Associate Spokesperson for Transport. He has been leader since 30 November 2021, succeeding Collins.

Early life 
Luxon was born in Christchurch on 19 July 1970 and lived there until age 7 when his family moved to Howick in Auckland. His father worked for Johnson & Johnson as a sales executive and his mother worked as a psychotherapist and counsellor. After a year's schooling at each of Saint Kentigern College and Howick College, the family returned to Christchurch and Luxon spent three years at Christchurch Boys' High School. He studied at the University of Canterbury from 1989 to 1992, gaining a Master of Commerce (Business Administration) degree.

Career before politics
Luxon worked for Unilever from 1993 to 2011, being based in Wellington (1993–1995), Sydney (1995–2000), London (2000–2003), Chicago (2003–2008) and Toronto (2008–2011). He rose to be the President and chief executive officer of its Canadian operations.

He joined Air New Zealand as Group General Manager in May 2011 and was named the chief executive officer on 19 June 2012, succeeding Rob Fyfe at the end of that year. During his eight-year leadership, Air New Zealand profits grew to record levels and the company was named Australia's most trusted brand several times. He joined the boards of the Tourism Industry Association New Zealand and Virgin Australia in 2014. In 2018, Luxon and Air New Zealand were heavily criticised by the workers' unions Aviation and Marine Engineers Association and E tū over a pay dispute. The unions had planned a three-day strike during Christmas of the same year, but the parties reached an agreement and the strike was called off. On 20 June 2019, Luxon announced that he was resigning from Air New Zealand and hinted at a possible career with the National Party.

In February 2021, it was revealed that while Luxon was CEO of Air New Zealand, its contracting business unit Gas Turbines was assisting Royal Saudi Navy vessels, despite them blocking essential supplies like water, food and medical assistance from Yemen. Luxon claimed to "have no recollection of it" and that "it might've post-dated my time" – the latter claim being disputed by his successor Greg Foran. It was met with criticism from Prime Minister Jacinda Ardern and the Green Party's human rights spokesperson Golriz Ghahraman. Luxon later admitted that Air New Zealand not having a process where its chief executive would be told about all military contracts "was a mistake".

Political career

After Jami-Lee Ross resigned from National over accusations of fraud against the party, Luxon secured the National Party candidacy for the Botany electorate, which has always been won by National and was regarded as a safe seat for them, in November 2019. He won in a selection contest with National Party list MP Agnes Loheni, Howick Local Board deputy chair Katrina Bungard, cancer drug campaigner Troy Elliott, and tech businessman Jake Bezzant, who was later selected as National's candidate for Upper Harbour.

Luxon won the seat in the 2020 New Zealand general election, defeating Labour's candidate Naisi Chen by a margin of 3,999 votes, and decreasing National's stronghold on the electorate by 9.17%.

In his maiden speech, Luxon praised Martin Luther King Jr. and Kate Sheppard as part of a defence of the role in public life of Christians such as himself, an identity that "it seems it has become acceptable to stereotype."

It was often speculated that Luxon would become leader of the National Party. After the removal of Judith Collins as party leader on 25 November 2021, Luxon was cited as a potential replacement. He took the leadership on 30 November, following the withdrawal of his main opponent, Simon Bridges.

In early August 2022, Luxon accompanied Prime Minister Ardern, Minister of Arts, Culture and Heritage Carmel Sepuloni and Minister of Pacific Peoples William Sio on a state visit to Samoa to mark the 60th anniversary of Samoa's independence and affirm bilateral relations between the two countries.

Political views
In November 2019, Luxon said he was against abortion, euthanasia, and legalising recreational cannabis, though at the same time he supported medicinal cannabis. He also at the time supported a "no jab, no pay" policy for sanctioning welfare beneficiaries who do not vaccinate their children; however, following his election as leader, Luxon said he did not support cutting the benefit of parents who do not vaccinate their children against COVID-19.

Views on the monarchy
When questioned about the matter of the Monarchy of New Zealand in 2022, Luxon stated that he was "comfortable" with the current constitutional arrangement of having the monarch as head of state and that Queen Elizabeth II had given New Zealand "incredible stability" and set an example of "great public service." Following the death of Queen Elizabeth II, Luxon expressed support for King Charles III, stating "I think he will be a very good king, I think he has been preparing for it all his life and no doubt he will take it in a different direction, reflecting his personality." He also expressed doubt on whether the Queen's death would advance support for republicanism in New Zealand, arguing "I visit two or three towns in New Zealand every week, it just isn't a topic of conversation that comes up. I appreciate at times like this we start thinking about having these conversations but there actually isn't a real desire for the conversation or to make any changes to the constitution arrangements."

Abortion
Luxon's views on abortion received media attention following his election as National's leader. He confirmed that his personal views are anti-abortion, but said he would not change abortion laws should he become prime minister. The pro-choice Abortion Law Reform Association of New Zealand put out a statement describing his views as "not representative of the values of mainstream New Zealanders."

He was questioned about being one of only 15 MPs to vote against the first reading of a member's bill that would establish safe areas around abortion facilities. He said that he was now able to support the bill following changes to it at the select committee stage that made it compliant with the New Zealand Bill of Rights. After previously declining to answer when asked if believes abortion to be tantamount to murder, he said in an interview with Newshub that he is "a pro-life person," and when asked again about the murder comparison, he responded "that's what a pro-life position is."

Despite his stated opposition to abortion and voting against of the Safe Areas Amendment Bill on its first reading, Luxon voted in favour during its second reading on 10 November 2021 and third reading on 16 March 2022.

In late June 2022, after the United States Supreme Court's overtuning of Roe v. Wade (1973), the National party was the only sitting political party in New Zealand that would not condemn the change. After increasing fears over the party's position on the topic, and a controversial Facebook post by fellow National MP Simon O'Connor, Luxon issued a second statement, which confirmed that a future National government would not seek to overturn New Zealand's abortion laws, but still did not condemn the law overturning in the United States. Luxon also stated that O’Connor's post did not represent the party's position on abortion and was removed for "causing distress." Following Luxon issuing two party statements in regards to Roe v. Wade, media asked him for his opinion on "People that get abortions", which he refrained to comment on, and refused to state if he still believed abortion is tantamount to murder.

In response to the controversy around O'Connor's post, former National MP Alfred Ngaro defended O'Connor's right to speak his mind and accused Luxon of silencing National MPs. The Deputy Prime Minister Grant Robertson questioned Luxon's commitment to protecting abortion rights, pointing out that half of the National Party caucus had voted against the Abortion Legislation Act in 2020.

The following day, after a statement from former National minister Amy Adams warning the party on its position on the topic, Luxon reiterated the National Party's commitment to women and claimed that women voters were concerned about the high cost of living, strained health system, struggling education system, and rising crime and gang violence.

Conversion therapy
In late November 2021, Luxon reiterated support for National's vote against the Conversion Practices Prohibition Legislation Bill, but said the practice was "abhorrent". In early February 2022, Luxon announced that National MPs would be allowed a conscience vote on the conversion practices legislation; abandoning Collins' "bloc-voting" position. Luxon also reversed his earlier opposition to the legislation, stating that he supported New Zealand's LGBTQI+ community. He also stated that "there will be those with different views for different reasons across Parliament. These sorts of issues are traditionally treated as conscience issues, and we determined as a caucus that this was the appropriate course in this instance." The Bill passed its third and final reading on 15 February 2022. Luxon voted in favour of the Bill's passage.

COVID-19 pandemic responses
On 8 December 2021, Luxon called for the lifting of Auckland's border restrictions with Northland after The New Zealand Herald reported that the Ministry of Health had proposed that the Auckland border should be lifted in tandem with the country's transition into the COVID-19 Protection Framework on 3 December. However, Prime Minister Jacinda Ardern and COVID-19 Response Minister Chris Hipkins had opted to retain the Auckland border until 15 December in order to reduce the risk of community transmissions and boost regional vaccination rates. Luxon has also questioned the effectiveness of the checkpoints led and managed by police in the Auckland–Northland boundary.

On 8 January 2022, Luxon talked to National MP Harete Hipango about a photo that she had posted on social media, which showed her posing with members of the anti-vaccination group Voices for Freedom. Hipango removed the post stating that the anti-vaccination views of the group did not align with that of the National Party. She and Luxon stated they and the National Party strongly support COVID-19 vaccination, and described vaccination as the best protection for people and their families.

In early February 2022, Luxon called for rapid antigen testing to be conducted in schools twice a week for both students and teachers, citing the examples of New South Wales and Victoria. In addition, Luxon advocated reopening New Zealand's borders and ending the managed isolation and quarantine (MIQ) system in favour of home isolation for New Zealanders and travellers who tested negative for COVID-19.

On 9 February 2022, Luxon called for the Government to issue a clear timeline for ending vaccine mandates. In response, Prime Minister Ardern stated that certificates and mandates would only be retained as long as there was a strong public health rationale.

Māori issues
In late January 2023, Luxon stated that National opposed co-governance in the delivery of public services such as health, education and critical infrastructure. He also clarified that National was not opposed to Māori involvement in decision-making and expressed supported for "self-driven" initiatives within the Māori community such as Whānau Ora, kohanga reo and charter schools. On 25 January, Luxon stated that Māori seats "doesn't make a lot of sense" but reiterated an earlier commitment in March 2022 that the National Party would stand candidates in at least two of them. 

During Waitangi Day on 6 February 2023, Luxon described the Treaty of Waitangi as a "challenging, imperfect but ultimately inspiring document through which New Zealand had sought to understand what was intended by those who signed it." While acknowledging that the New Zealand Crown had not upheld the Treaty's promises and obligations, he expressed hope that the Treaty land compensation process would be completed by 2030.

Organised crime
In mid–June 2022, Luxon announced that the National Party if elected into government would introduce several pieces of anti-gang legislation based on Australian anti-gang legislation. These "zero tolerance" policies have included banning gang insignia in public spaces and social media platforms such as Instagram and TikTok, and giving the Police special powers to disperse gang gatherings, and prevent certain gang members from associating with each other or obtaining firearms. Luxon unveiled National's new law and order policies in the midst of rising gang activity and gang warfare in 2022.

In response, Waikato Mongrel Mob Kingdom ariki Sonny Fatupaito claimed that Luxon's proposed policies would breach human rights legislation and the Treaty of Waitangi while perpetuating racism and racial profiling against Māori and Pasifika. Andrew Cushen, Interim chief executive for InternetNZ stated that “gang posts on social media and extremist material are very different and can't be policed in the same way.” And that the policy would be “nearly impossible to police”. Criminologist and gangs expert Dr. Jarrod Gilbert opined that combating the gangs' criminal activities would work better than targeting the gangs. The Prime Minister Jacinda Ardern stated that similar policies had not worked in other countries. While supporting for National's anti-gang policies, the ACT Party's firearms law reform and justice spokeswoman Nicole McKee expressed concern that legitimate firearms owners could be affected by some of the legislation. Former National Party MP and Minister Chester Borrows questioned the effectiveness of National's proposed anti-gang legislation, citing the failure of earlier anti-gang insignia legislation in Whanganui.

Welfare
In early July 2022, Luxon stated that a future National Government would work with community providers to sponsor job coaches for young people under the age of 25 years who have been on the Jobseeker benefit for three months. Welfare beneficiaries who find a job and stay off the benefit for the next 12 consecutive months would receive NZ$1,000 for staying in the workforce.  However, beneficiaries who do not follow their agreed plan will face "sanctions." Luxon claimed that the incumbent Labour Government's policies had caused the number of under 25s on welfare to increase by 34,000 (roughly 40%).

Youth crime
In mid November 2022, Luxon announced that the National Party's youth crime policies would include creating a new Young Serious Offender category for juvenile offenders and establishing boot camps known as Youth Offender Military Academies. National's proposed boot camp policy was criticised by Prime Minister Ardern, Green Party co-leader Marama Davidson, and the NZ Psychological Society, who described it as ineffective and counterproductive deterrents to crime. 

In early December 2022, a 1 News Kantar public opinion poll found that 60% of respondents supported National's military boot camp policy while 31% opposed it and 9% were undecided. The poll surveyed 1,011 eligible voters including mobile phone users and online panels. While National and ACT voters, women aged 55 years and above, and Aucklanders favoured the policy,  Green voters, Wellingtonians, Labour voters, and those aged between 18 and 29 years were more likely to oppose the policy.

Personal life
Luxon had a Catholic upbringing, describes himself as a Christian or non-denominational Christian, and has been described as an evangelical Christian. He has attended a Baptist church in Auckland as a child, a Presbyterian church in Australia, an Anglican church in England, and non-denominational churches in the United States, Canada and New Zealand. After he returned to New Zealand in 2011 he attended the Upper Room church in Auckland. In 2021 he said he had not attended a church for five or six years. He met his wife Amanda at a church youth group and they married when he was 23. They have a son and daughter, William and Olivia. He says he enjoys DIY, listens to country music and likes to waterski.

In late July 2022, Luxon confirmed he was on a family holiday in Hawaii during the parliamentary recess when a Facebook video post published on 21 July implied he was visiting Te Puke at that time. Luxon attributed the confusion to a delay in his social media team updating his whereabouts over the previous week, which he said was a mistake.

References

External links
 

Living people
1970 births
New Zealand businesspeople
New Zealand chief executives
21st-century New Zealand politicians
New Zealand Christians
People from Christchurch
People from Auckland
Candidates in the 2020 New Zealand general election
New Zealand MPs for Auckland electorates
New Zealand National Party MPs
New Zealand National Party leaders
Leaders of the Opposition (New Zealand)
New Zealand monarchists
People educated at Christchurch Boys' High School
People educated at Saint Kentigern College
People educated at Howick College